Tetraopes skillmani is a species of beetle in the family Cerambycidae. It was described by Chemsak and Noguera in 2004. It is known from the United States.

References

Tetraopini
Beetles described in 2004